John Williston "Bud" Bird,  (born March 22, 1932 in Fredericton, New Brunswick) is a Canadian businessman who is a former mayor of the city of Fredericton, a Progressive Conservative Party of New Brunswick member of the Legislative Assembly of New Brunswick, and a Progressive Conservative Party of Canada member of the House of Commons of Canada.

Business career
In 1958, he founded J. W. Bird and Company Limited, suppliers to the construction industry. In 1975, he acquired William Stairs Son & Morrow Ltd. of Halifax, Nova Scotia, becoming Bird Stairs Limited. The business was sold to employees and today he operates Bird Holdings Ltd. And is majority shareholder of Sunpoke Energy Systems Ltd.

Political offices
Bud Bird served as Mayor of Fredericton from 1969 to 1974. He was elected to the Legislative Assembly of New Brunswick in 1978 and served as in the government of Richard Hatfield as Minister of Natural Resources from November 21, 1978 until he resigned from the Legislature on June 10, 1982.

Bird ran in the November 21, 1988 Federal election, winning a seat in the 34th Canadian Parliament for the Fredericton riding. He was defeated in the 1993 election.

A sport fisherman and conservationist, Bird is Chairman Emeritus of the Miramichi Salmon Association and has been a Director of both the Atlantic Salmon Federation of Canada and Atlantic Salmon Federation of the United States.

In 2001, Bird was made an Officer of the Order of Canada.

Electoral history

References
 J. W. Bird record at the Parliament of Canada
 Bird Holdings Ltd.

1932 births
Living people
Businesspeople from New Brunswick
Mayors of Fredericton
Progressive Conservative Party of New Brunswick MLAs
Members of the Executive Council of New Brunswick
Members of the House of Commons of Canada from New Brunswick
Progressive Conservative Party of Canada MPs
Officers of the Order of Canada
Canadian people of English descent